The Raven is a series  of 28 watercolor paintings made by Nabil Kanso in 1995. The subjects of the works in the series are based on the 1845 poem "The Raven" by Edgar Allan Poe.

References

External links
The Raven series

Painting series
Watercolor paintings
Adaptations of works by Edgar Allan Poe
1995 paintings
Birds in art
Paintings based on literature